Henri Favre was a Swiss racing cyclist. He was the Swiss National Road Race champion in 1894 and 1895.

References

External links

Year of birth missing
Year of death missing
Swiss male cyclists
Place of birth missing